Gleichenia polypodioides (L.) Sm., commonly known as coral fern, kystervaring ('kyster' meaning 'coastal' and of possible Scandinavian derivation) or ystervaring (meaning 'iron fern' in Afrikaans) due to its glabrous, brown, wiry stipes. The species is widespread in south- and east tropical Africa, southern Africa and the western Indian Ocean region. It occurs naturally in a broad coastal belt in South Africa, Lesotho, Eswatini, Angola, Malawi, Burundi, Tanzania, Mozambique, Zimbabwe, Mauritius, Réunion, Amsterdam Island and Madagascar, and was first described by Carl Linnaeus in 1771 under the name Onoclea polypodioides. Often forming dense and impenetrable thickets, sometimes over large areas, this rhizomatous perennial is an important pioneer in disturbed areas such as pine plantations. It is often mistakenly seen as an exotic invader rather than as a useful rehabilitation plant, a source of peat and growing medium, while showing exceptional resistance to herbicides.

 

The genus is named after the German botanist W.F. von Gleichen, while "polypodioides" denotes a resemblance to Polypodium which also has sori sunk into the frond surface. Gleichenia polypodioides is one of 12 species in the genus, and occurs on sheltered rocks and slopes, along stream- and earthbanks, on road embankments and other disturbed areas, in cool regions of high rainfall or frequent mist, on sites enjoying full sun or light shade. In the subtropics it occurs at elevations from 1,220 to 1,870 m, but in South Africa it is present near sea level.

Synonyms
Calymella polypodioides (L.) Ching
Gleichenia argentea Kaulf.
Gleichenia glauca Sw.
Mertensia caeruleo-glauca Poir.
Onoclea polypodioides L.

References

External links
Map showing South African distribution
South African National Biodiversity Institute, Compton Herbarium
Gallery

polypodioides